Wayne Wettlaufer (December 16, 1943 – June 21, 2015) was a politician in Ontario, Canada. He was a Progressive Conservative member of the Legislative Assembly of Ontario from 1995 to 2003. In 2014 he was elected as a regional councillor for Kitchener and he served in that position until his death in 2015.

Background
Wettlaufer obtained a Bachelor of Arts degree from the University of Guelph. He worked as an insurance manager for K.W. Insurance in 1963, and as an insurance inspector for Waterloo Mutual and Gore Mutual, Ottawa in 1972. He was promoted to corporate marketing manager with Gore Mutual, Cambridge in 1980, and became a partner in the firm of Wettlaufer, Collins, Rankin Insurance Brokers in 1984. He remained a member of this firm until winning political office in 1995.

Politics
Wettlaufer was elected to the Ontario legislature for the riding of Kitchener in the provincial election of 1995, defeating Liberal candidate Bryan Stortz by over 3,000 votes.  The Progressive Conservatives won a majority government in this election and Wettlaufer served as a backbench supporter of the Mike Harris government.

In 1996, the Harris government reduced the number of ridings from 130 to 103. This change meant that sitting MPPs had to compete against one another for re-nomination in some ridings. Wettlaufer ran for the Kitchener Centre PC nomination in 1999 defeating fellow PC member Gary Leadston. Wettlaufer was re-elected in the provincial election of 1999, defeating Liberal Berry Vrbanovic by over 4,000 votes in the redistributed riding of Kitchener Centre.  He was appointed to the position of deputy whip after the election, and continued in his role as a backbencher throughout his time in the legislature.

As a backbencher, he passed a Private Member's Bill designating the day after Thanksgiving in each year as German Pioneers Day in Ontario. In the provincial election of 2003, Wettlaufer lost to Liberal candidate John Milloy by just over 2,000 votes.

Wettlaufer endorsed Frank Klees for the leadership of the Ontario PC Party in 2004 and 2009. In 2005, he vied for the PC nomination in the Federal riding of Kitchener-Conestoga. He lost to Harold Albrecht who went on to win the contest in the Canadian election of 2006.

In 2012, as president of the Ontario chapter of the German-Canadian Congress, Wettlaufer defended accused war criminal Helmut Oberlander who was stripped of his Canadian citizenship. Wettlaufer said, "The court case did not prove beyond a doubt that he was a war criminal." On July 3, 2013, Wettlaufer stirred controversy with a tweet, later deleted, that claimed female electors vote for the Liberal Party because they "get all their information from the Toronto Star" and are "less informed".

He was a candidate in the provincial election of 2014 in his old riding of Kitchener Centre. During the election campaign Wettlaufer contradicted his party platform during an all candidate debate when he said that public sector jobs would be cut entirely through attrition. He was defeated by Liberal candidate Daiene Vernile by 6,913 votes.

He was elected as a regional councillor for Kitchener in the 2014 election but served less than a year before his death on June 21, 2015.

Electoral record

References

Notes

Citations

External links
 

1943 births
2015 deaths
Politicians from Kitchener, Ontario
Progressive Conservative Party of Ontario MPPs
21st-century Canadian politicians
University of Guelph alumni